Krill are small crustaceans of the order Euphausiacea.

Krill may also refer to:
Krill (fictional alien race), on the television show The Orville
Antarctic krill, a species of krill
Northern krill, a species of krill
Commander Krill, a character in the film Under Siege

People with the surname
Natalie Krill (born 1983), Canadian actress
Sean Allan Krill (born 1971), American actor